Jerome Francis McCarthy (May 23, 1923 – October 3, 1965) was an American Major League Baseball first baseman who played for the St. Louis Browns in . McCarthy was born in Brooklyn, New York, on May 23, 1923. He entered the University of Pennsylvania in 1941.

McCarthy played varsity football as a sophomore, but then left school to serve in the United States Army Air Corps  from 1943 until 1945. When he returned to Penn in 1946, he rejoined the varsity football team as a lineman, and served as captain. He also played first base on Penn's varsity baseball team, serving as its captain in 1948. McCarthy was honored by his senior class as Bowl Man.

After graduation, McCarthy was signed by the St. Louis Browns as an amateur free agent. He made his major league baseball debut on June 19, 1948, as a first baseman with the Browns. He played only the one season.

McCarthy later became an advertising salesman for the Army Times Publishing Co., in New York City. He was living in Freeport, Long Island, at the time of his death in Oceanside, New York, on October 3, 1965.

References

External links

Jerome Francis McCarthy biography

1923 births
1965 deaths
Penn Quakers baseball players
Penn Quakers football players
St. Louis Browns players
United States Army Air Forces personnel of World War II
Sportspeople from Brooklyn
Baseball players from New York City
Players of American football from New York (state)
Baseball players from New York (state)
Columbus Cardinals players
Elmira Pioneers players
San Antonio Missions players
Springfield Browns players
Burials at the Cemetery of the Holy Rood